Luxembourg competed at the 2022 World Aquatics Championships in Budapest, Hungary from 17 June to 3 July.

Swimming

Luxembourg entered four swimmers.

Men

References

World Aquatics Championships
2022
Nations at the 2022 World Aquatics Championships